Douglas Pereira dos Santos (born 6 August 1990), simply known as Douglas, is a Brazilian professional footballer who last played as a right-back for Beşiktaş.

Club career

Goiás
Born in Monte Alegre de Goiás, Douglas joined Goiás' youth setup in 2002, aged 12, and was promoted to the first-team in 2009, mainly as a backup to Vítor. He made his professional – and Série A – debut on 20 June 2009, coming on as a late substitute in a 2–2 away draw against Grêmio.

Douglas was handed his first start on 15 July, in a 0–2 home loss against Avaí. He finished the campaign with 14 appearances (seven starts, 741 minutes of action), as his side finished ninth.

In 2010, after Victor's departure to Palmeiras, Douglas became the club's first-choice, appearing in 24 matches but being relegated. He scored his first professional goal on 15 July 2011, netting the last of a 4–1 home routing over Vitória for the Série B championship.

Douglas finished the season with 26 appearances, scoring five goals as the Esmeraldino finished in the 11th place.

São Paulo
On 11 February 2012, Douglas signed a three-year deal with São Paulo. However, he missed the whole Campeonato Paulista due to a pubalgia.

Douglas made his debut for Tricolor on 6 June 2012, starting in a 0–1 away loss against Internacional. He scored his first goal for the club on 14 October, netting the last of a 2–0 home success against Figueirense. He was also a regular in the club's Copa Sudamericana winning campaign.

Douglas featured regularly for the club in 2013, but faced fierce competition with new signing Paulo Miranda. The latter was later more used as a central defender, while the former also appeared as a central midfielder in some occasions.

In 2014 Douglas was again challenged by another new face, Luis Ricardo. He was mainly a backup to the latter during the year's Campeonato Paulista, but later retained his place in the starting XI.

Barcelona
On 26 August 2014, Douglas agreed a five-year deal with La Liga club Barcelona for amount of €4 million fee plus €1.5 million in add-ons. He signed his contract with the Catalans three days later, being presented hours later.

After being an unused substitute in Barça's 1–0 home win against APOEL for the season's UEFA Champions League, Douglas made his debut on 24 September, starting and being booked in a 0–0 draw at Málaga. He was later criticized for his performance, and was demoted to third-choice right back behind Dani Alves and Martín Montoya, only being limited to appear in Copa del Rey.

Loan deals
On 26 August 2016, Barcelona and Sporting de Gijón reached an agreement for the season-long loan of Douglas. He made his debut for the Asturians on 17 September in a 5–0 loss at Atlético Madrid, and scored his first goal in Spanish football on 4 December in a 3–1 win against Osasuna at El Molinón. He totalled 23 appearances and three goals over the season, but Sporting were relegated.

On 30 August 2017, Douglas joined Portuguese champions Benfica on a season-long loan deal.

On 24 July 2018, Douglas was loaned once again, this time to Turkish side Sivasspor. His first goal for Sivasspor was in a Süper Lig match with Trabzonspor.

Beşiktaş
In 2019 Douglas left Barcelona for the Turkish club Beşiktaş.

Douglas is currently a free agent after being released from Beşiktaş in 2022.

International career
Douglas was a member of the Brazil national under-20 team, appearing in the 2009 South American U-20 Championship and 2009 FIFA U-20 World Cup.

Career statistics

Notes

Honours
São Paulo
Copa Sudamericana: 2012

Barcelona
La Liga: 2014–15, 2015–16
Copa del Rey: 2014–15, 2015–16
Supercopa de España: 2016
UEFA Champions League: 2014-15
UEFA Super Cup: 2015
FIFA Club World Cup: 2015

References

External links

1990 births
Living people
Sportspeople from Goiás
Brazilian footballers
Association football defenders
Campeonato Brasileiro Série A players
Campeonato Brasileiro Série B players
La Liga players
Primeira Liga players
Süper Lig players
Goiás Esporte Clube players
São Paulo FC players
FC Barcelona players
Sporting de Gijón players
S.L. Benfica footballers
Sivasspor footballers
Beşiktaş J.K. footballers
Brazilian expatriate footballers
Expatriate footballers in Spain
Brazilian expatriate sportspeople in Spain
Expatriate footballers in Portugal
Brazilian expatriate sportspeople in Portugal
Brazil youth international footballers
Brazil under-20 international footballers
UEFA Champions League winning players